Cañón Point is a headland marking the southwest side of the entrance to Bancroft Bay, on the west coast of Graham Land. It was first roughly charted by the Belgian Antarctic Expedition under Gerlache, 1897–99. The name appears on an Argentine government chart of 1954.

References
 

Headlands of Graham Land
Danco Coast